MSG, or monosodium glutamate, is a salt that is found in various foods, naturally or artificially introduced (added to).

MSG or msg may also refer to:

Arenas
 Madison Square Garden, a sports arena in New York City, United States, the fourth by the name
Madison Square Garden (1879), the first arena of the name
Madison Square Garden (1890), the second arena of the name
Madison Square Garden (1925), the third arena of the name

Arts, entertainment, and media

Music
 Manchester Sports Guild or MSG, a bygone (1961–1973) jazz and folk venue in Manchester, England
 McAuley Schenker Group, a rock band led by Michael Schenker
 M.S.G. (McAuley Schenker Group album) (1992)
 Michael Schenker Group, a rock band led by Michael Schenker 
 MSG (album), an album by the Michael Schenker Group
 Nightmare: The Acoustic M.S.G., an EP by the McAuley Schenker Group, released only in Japan
 Notorious MSG, a New York-based hip-hop group

Other uses in arts, entertainment, and media
 MSG Network, an American regional cable and satellite television network and radio service
MSG Sportsnet, its sister channel
 MSG: The Messenger, a 2015 Indian action film
 Mobile Suit Gundam, a 1979 Japanese anime series
 The Message (Bible), an idiomatic translation of the Bible

Military
 HK MSG-90, a sniper rifle made in Germany by Heckler-Koch
 Maine State Guard, active during World War II
 Marine Security Guard, marines posted as guards at U.S. embassies abroad
 Master sergeant, a military rank
 Minnesota State Guard, active during World War II
 Mississippi State Guard, the state defense force of Mississippi
 Missouri State Guard, an American Civil War militia

Organizations
 Melanesian Spearhead Group, an intergovernmental organization composed of four Melanesian states
 Muettersproch-Gsellschaft (Society For the Mother Tongue), society for preservation of Alemannic dialects
Madison Square Garden Sports (known as MSG Sports), owner of the New York Knicks, New York Rangers, and other sports teams
Madison Square Garden Entertainment (known as MSG Entertainment), owner of Madison Square Garden and other entertainment properties
Monaco Sports Group, a Monegasque racing team

People
 M.S.G., a former member of Bloodhound Gang
 M. S. Gopalakrishnan or MSG, an Indian violinist
 Mikhail Sergeyevich Gorbachev, Soviet politician
 Gurmeet Ram Rahim Singh, an Indian religious leader, actor, singer, writer, songwriter, director, composer, and rape convict, popularly known as MSG.

Science and technology

Computing
 Msg, a command in BITNET Relay
 msg, an e-mail filename extension used by Microsoft Outlook
 MSG.exe, Windows Messenger service's successor in Microsoft Windows Vista for system notification
MsgPlus!, a Microsoft messenger service

Structures in outer space
 Meteosat Second Generation, a series of geostationary meteorological satellites
 Microgravity Science Glovebox, on the International Space Station

Other uses in science and technology
 M-SG reducing agent, an alkali metal absorbed into silica gel
 Monosodium glutamate, sodium salt of glutamic acid
 Mixed sand and gravel, a geological category of beach structure